Swami's is an area in San Diego County that contains Swami's Beach and other local attractions. The beach, also known as "Swami’s Reef'" and "Swamis", is an internationally known surfing spot, a point break located in Encinitas, San Diego County, California. Swami's was named after Swami Paramahansa Yogananda, because the grounds and hermitage of the Self-Realization Fellowship ashram, built in 1937, overlook this reef point. The name "Swami's" is also given to the sand beach that extends south from the point to the next beach access point, which is next to the San Elijo State Beach camping area; this more southerly surf spot often goes by the name "Pipes".

Originally the name "Swami's" was an unofficial nickname that surfers had given to the point break, but eventually the name was adopted officially, and also used as the name of the cliff-top park, which was previously known as "Seacliff Roadside Park".

Activities

Beach access 
Access to Swami Beach is primarily through the small "Swami" park at the top of the cliff, which has bathrooms, a water fountain, benches, picnic tables, and trees. There is also a small parking lot. At the edge of the park is a wooden staircase that leads down to the sand beach.

Swami's offers a sand beach available from 4a.m. to 2a.m. and has lifeguard towers open from 10a.m. to 6p.m. during the period of Late June to Labor Day (Early September). Beach parking is available from 5a.m. to 10p.m. The beach is available on a first-come, first-served basis and is maintained by the Encinitas Parks and Recreation Department.

Encinitas beaches, including Swami's, prohibit pet dogs, transportable barbecue grills, drinking glasses, and any sort of smoking or alcohol.

Surfing
Swami's is a major surfing destination, especially during good swells in the winter months, because of its standout right point break, the only one of its kind in North County. The number of surfers out can be very considerable when conditions are good. Surfing at this location is ideal with a low to mid-tide, W or NW swell direction, and calm or East wind.

Swami's allows all levels of surfers, but is well known as a high-performance wave for both longboard and shortboard surfers, though longboarders usually dominate the lineup. Bodysurfing and bodyboarding are rare due to the highly competitive nature of the crowd to catch and ride the limited number of waves that come in sets every few minutes.

Swami's is also known as a challenging spot to paddle, requiring a level of fitness above what other breaks demand. This is primarily due to the distance from the beach to the main peak, several hundred yards from shore. As the waves become larger this distance increases, and after long rides the paddle back to the main peak can take several minutes. For this reason, many surfers will choose to end their rides before the wave reaches the beach.

There are primarily two ways in which surfers initially paddle out to the main peak. The more common way is to approach from south of the break (directly in front of the lifeguard tower) and paddle around the break through the deep water (known as the channel). The other method of paddling out is to walk north two hundred yards and approach the main peak by means of a rougher, more turbulent shortcut. While riskier (due to the rough nature of the waves in this zone), it can be a significantly quicker route to the main peak.  This is often known as "paddling out through the back door." Most novice surfers will avoid this method as it requires greater skill and fitness.

Swami's is a common surfing ground for local professional surfers, including Rob Machado, and Taylor Knox.

Self-Realization Fellowship Meditation Gardens and Hermitage 

In 1920, Paramahansa Yogananda founded the Self-Realization Fellowship. Yogananda came from India as a representative for the international congress of religions and wanted to bring the great teachings of meditation to Americans. The meditation garden is filled with flowers, plants, trees and a number of small ponds featuring small waterfalls and koi fish. It extends from the starting point of the meditation garden to the beach cliffs of Swami's.

There is a nearby gift shop on Highway 101. Activities at the nearby SRF Encinitas Temple on Second St. include weekly Sunday services for adults and Sunday school for children, as well as meditations, kirtan chanting, scriptural readings, commemorations, and many opportunities to serve.

Ecology 
Swami's ecology has a variety of habitats. These include grassy surf beds, and rocky reefs where lobsters and various types of fish and invertebrates live and consume food. Additional, visitors can see sea animals and such as sea hares, brittle stars, and octopuses in nearby pools. Visitors can also view nearly 45-million-year-old fossils in level rocks.

Conservation 
The Swami's Reef is a protected area through the California Marine Life Protection Act. This act protects nearby sea life and habitats from removal. In addition, fishing is strictly prohibited in this particular area.

Swami's Surfing Association 
Swami's Surfing Association was established in 1964 by local surfers as a non-profit organization dedicated to improving the beach community and helping environmental issues.

SSA sponsors and participates in programs, such as Adopt-a-Beach, Disabled Vietnam Veterans, the Blind Surf Program, and many more. For the past 18 years, SSA has held a surfing contest in Encinitas. These events and programs are funded by sponsors from the community. Donations may be tax-deductible as charitable contributions.

In popular culture

 Swami's is mentioned in the 1963 Beach Boys' song Surfin' U.S.A.

See also
 List of beaches in the San Diego area
 List of California state parks
 California State Beaches

References

External links

Video
Swamis, Dec 21st, 2005
Swamis, Dec 21st, 2005 Video #2
Swamis 2003

Photographs
Phillip Cola Natural History Photography
Pbase Photoset

Surfing locations in California
Encinitas, California
Beaches of Southern California
Reefs of California
Paramahansa Yogananda
Tourist attractions in San Diego County, California
Beaches of San Diego County, California